Bolshoye Lubozino is a rural locality (a village) in Kichmengskoye Rural Settlement, Kichmengsko-Gorodetsky District, Vologda Oblast, Russia. The population was 55 as of 2002.

Geography 
Bolshoye Lubozino is located 31 km southwest of Kichmengsky Gorodok (the district's administrative centre) by road. Mikheyevo is the nearest rural locality.

References 

Rural localities in Kichmengsko-Gorodetsky District